Firefighter F.D.18 is an action game created and produced by Konami Computer Entertainment and released in March 2004 for the PlayStation 2.

Story
The game revolves around Dean McGregor, a highly skilled firefighter.
The plot is supposedly taken from the film Backdraft, and this is backed by the fact that many similarities can be found, such as the locations of the fires, the company number, and the cinematic sequences.

Gameplay
In this game, players become firefighters.  Their goal is to clear areas where fire has broken out and rescue civilians and fight fire "bosses" at the end.  Players have an axe, a fire hose, and a fire extinguisher to break down doors and put out fires as they rescue survivors.  Stages are timed.  Obstacles, such as falling beams, and chemicals, hinder progress and must be cleared before the player can progress further.

Plot
There are several stages. They are:
1. A tunnel.
2. A computer research facility.
3. A ship.
4. A chemical plant.

The story starts somewhere in the United States with Dean's company battling a fire in the I-42 tunnel battling an intense blaze and rescuing survivors including the up and coming Senator Harris Blackwell just as a tanker blows up. A hardware developer named Jason Hunt watches the news of Blackwell's survival and conspires with Cyclone Networks board member Paul Murphy to further attempt assassination on the Senator.

Sometime later, the Cyclone Networls facility catches fire and Dean works to fight the fire. He also rescues the reporter he met at the tunnel fire, Emilie Arvin who is getting a story on the fires and Cyclone Networks's data managing hardware. After braving gas leaks, Dean meets Murphy at a walkway in the main building, but Murphy is killed in the blaze which someone deliberately set. Jason panics over the fact that Emilie is gathering evidence against him and Blackwell and vows to kill the people trying to crack down on him.

On a docked ocean liner, Blackwell holds a party to honor Dean for saving his life. Dean tells Emilie of a tragic fire years ago when an arsonist started a fire in a hotel where Dean and his family were having a party for his sister. In the chaos that time, Dean's parents died, while his sister was presumed missing. Dean wants to be certain she survived the fire when another fire breaks out on the ship. Battling the blaze in the ballroom, Dean begins to suspect Jason Hunt is starting the fires for his own grudge. After rescuing passengers in the cabins, the boat's garage and engine room, Jason calls up to reveal he has kidnapped Emilie and taken her to a nearby chemical plant.

As he battles the fire, Dean and his partner Craig learn from the captive Emilie that Blackwell and Hunt ere manufacturing illegal data in the plant. In the process of fighting the fire, Craig is injured in a bomb explosion. Most of the people are evacuated but the fire is still out of control. Dean confronts Hunt who fights with a flamethrower. Dean outwits the arsonist who admits that Senator Blackwell was the true villain behind the fires and the data scheme. Blackwell has his bodyguard kill Hunt and admits that Hunt and Murphy conspired to have him killed, but the senator wanted to make money off of Hunt's hardware and had Murphy burned to death in the facility fire. He tries to have Dean put to death by his bodyguard, but the former defeats him. Blackwell tries to escape in his helicopter, and Dean tries to save the senator to make him stand trial for his crimes. But the senator unfortunately aims a gun at the firefighter before a blast throws his aim off and the senator falls to a fiery death.

As Dean races to find his way out before the plant is burned down by Hunt's remaining bombs, he rescues Emilie from her storage room prison. Emilie presents her story on the news, while Dean continues his war against fire.

References

2004 video games
Action video games
Konami games
PlayStation 2 games
PlayStation 2-only games
Video games about firefighting
Video games developed in Japan